German submarine U-180 was a Type IXD1 transport U-boat of Nazi Germany's Kriegsmarine which served in World War II. Her keel was laid down on 25 February 1941 at the DeSchiMAG AG Weser yard in Bremen as yard number 1020. She was launched on 10 December 1941 and commissioned on 16 May 1942 under Fregattenkapitän Werner Musenberg (Crew 25). Stripped of torpedo armament, the Type IXD1s were designated as transport submarines, and could carry up to 252 tonnes of freight. U-180 was used primarily in clandestine operations.

Design
German Type IXD1 submarines were considerably larger than the original Type IXs. U-180 had a displacement of  when at the surface and  while submerged. She had two shafts and two  propellers.

U-180 was fitted with six  torpedo tubes (four fitted at the bow and two at the stern), 24 torpedoes, one  SK C/32 naval gun, 150 rounds, and a  SK C/30 with 2575 rounds as well as two  C/30 anti-aircraft guns with 8100 rounds. The boat had a complement of fifty-five.

Service history

First patrol

U-180 sailed from Kiel on 8 February 1943, with the leader of the Indian National Army Netaji Subhas Chandra Bose and his aide Abid Hasan aboard.

Nine days later, on 27 April, the boat made her rendezvous with the Imperial Japanese Navy , just east of Madagascar in the Indian Ocean, Bose and Hassan  boarded I-29 and two Japanese naval officers, both shipbuilding officers, Captains Emi Tetsushiro and Tomonaga Hideo, who were to study U-boat building techniques upon their arrival in Germany, boarded U-180. Bose and Hasan's transfer is the only known record of a civilian transfer between two submarines of two different navies in World War II. Also received were two tonnes of gold ingots as payment from Japan for weapons technology.

Second patrol and loss
Under the command of Oberleutnant zur See Rolf Riesen (Crew 38), U-180 sailed from Bordeaux on 20 August 1944 bound for Japan. She was reported sunk off the Bay of Biscay on 23 August 1944, with the loss of all of her 56 crew. The official verdict is "sunk by a mine", however, some experts speculate that trouble with the schnorkel (the underwater breathing and engine operating device), may have been the cause.

Summary of raiding history

Media
 U-180 is the submarine carrying Nazi party secretary, Martin Bormann, to South America in the Jack Higgins thriller, Thunder Point.
 U-180 is featured in the thriller Spook's Gold by Andrew Wood. The rendezvous on 21 April between U-180 and I-29, as well as an exchange of gold and military goods is a key element of the plot.

References

Bibliography

External links

 U-180 and the Secret Operation  trans. 

 

1941 ships
German Type IX submarines
Ships built in Bremen (state)
Ships lost with all hands
Shipwrecks in the Bay of Biscay
Subhas Chandra Bose
U-boats commissioned in 1942
U-boats sunk by mines
U-boats sunk in 1944
Missing U-boats of World War II
World War II shipwrecks in the Atlantic Ocean
World War II submarines of Germany
Maritime incidents in August 1944